Cuangar  is a town and municipality in Cuando Cubango Province in Angola. The town lies on the Okavango River, opposite the town of Nkurenkuru, Namibia. The municipality had a population of 28,459 in 2014. It is situated pe*kose to a fort.

References

Populated places in Cuando Cubango Province
Municipalities of Angola
Angola–Namibia border crossings